Juan Armada y Losada  (May 4, 1861 in Madrid – September 22, 1932 in Abegondo) was a Spanish politician. He was the 29th Solicitor General of Spain, President of the Congress of Deputies, Minister of Development and Minister of Justice. He was a novelist and a poet both in Castillan and Galician.

References

1861 births
1932 deaths
Presidents of the Congress of Deputies (Spain)
Politicians from Madrid
Justice ministers of Spain
Conservative Party (Spain) politicians